Atmore may refer to:

Places
 Atmore, Alabama
 Atmore, Alberta

People
 Charles Atmore
 Harry Atmore